Padmarajan Award (Padmarajan Puraskaram) is instituted by Padmarajan Memorial Trust in memory of author and filmmaker P. Padmarajan and is given for the best short story and best feature film produced in Malayalam language.

Award for Short-story

Award for Novel

Award for Cinema

Award for Best Director

Award for Best Screenwriter

References

Indian literary awards
Awards established in 1992
Malayalam literary awards
Indian film awards
1992 establishments in Kerala